KR Motors Co. Ltd. is a South Korean motorcycle manufacturer.

History
Founded in 1978 as a division of the Hyosung Group of industries, Hyosung began producing Japanese Suzuki motorcycle designs under license for the South Korean market in Changwon, South Korea in 1979.  In 1986, they established their own research and development center in Hamamatsu, Japan, and the next year, they began mass production of their own designs.  They were the official motorcycle supplier for the 1988 Summer Olympics in Seoul.  In 2003, Hyosung Motors & Machinery Inc. was spun off from the Hyosung Group to become its own corporate entity.  In June 2007, Hyosung Motors Division was acquired by Korean company S&T Group (Science and Technology), and the name was changed to S&T Motors. In 2014 S&T Motors was acquired by Kolao Holdings(now known as LVMC Holdings), and the name was changed to KR Motors.

Current products

Recently, KR Motors has expanded from its traditional business of simple and efficient bikes for commuting into the recreational market.  This includes adding models with larger engine displacement, up to 678cc and expanding into developed markets such as Australia, Northern Europe, Canada, India and the United States.

Sportbikes "Comet"
GT650R
GT650S
GT250R
GD250R / Naza N5R
GT125R
Standards - "Comet"
GT650
GT250
GT125
 GD250N Exiv / Naza N5

Cruisers
ST7
GV650 - "Mirage/Aquila"
GV250 - "Mirage/Aquila"
GV125C
"Work" motorcycles
KR110
Scooters
Exceed
 Megajet
 Rapid
SF50 "Prima"
SF50R "Rally"/"Rally50"
SF100 "Rally100"
SD50 "Sense"
MS3 125/250
 Grand Prix 125 4T
 Supercap
Off-road bikes

 RT 125

RX125
 Troy
ATVs
TE50 "WOW50"
TE100 "WOW100"
LT160
TE450

External links
 KR Motors English Homepage

Companies based in Changwon
Motorcycle manufacturers of South Korea
Scooter manufacturers
South Korean brands
Vehicle manufacturing companies established in 1978
South Korean companies established in 1978